Bungarus is a genus of venomous elapid snakes, the kraits ("krait" is pronounced , rhyming with "kite"), found in South and Southeast Asia. The genus Bungarus has 16 species.

Distribution
Kraits are found in tropical Asia, from near Iran, through the Indian subcontinent (including Sri Lanka and Bangladesh) and on to Southeast Asia (including Indonesia and Borneo).

Description
Most species of kraits are covered in smooth, glossy scales arranged in bold, striped patterns of alternating black and light-colored areas. This may serve as aposematic colouration in its habitat of grassland and scrub jungle. The scales along the dorsal ridge of the back are hexagonal. The head is slender, and the eyes have round pupils. Kraits have pronounced dorsolateral flattening, which causes them to be triangular in cross section.

Diet and behavior
Kraits are ophiophagous, preying primarily upon other snakes (including venomous varieties) and are cannibalistic, feeding on other kraits. They also eat mice and small lizards.

All kraits are nocturnal. They are more docile during the daylight; at night, they become very active, but are not very aggressive even when provoked. They are actually rather timid, and often hide their heads within their coiled bodies for protection. When in this posture, they sometimes whip their tails around as a type of distraction.

Reproduction
Kraits are oviparous. The female lays a clutch of 12 to 14 eggs in piles of leaf litter, and stays with them until they hatch.

Venom
Bungarus contains some species which are among the most venomous land snakes in the world to mice based on their . They have a highly potent neurotoxic venom, which can induce muscle paralysis. Clinically, their venom contains mostly presynaptic neurotoxins. These affect the ability of neuron endings to properly release the chemical that sends the message to the next neuron. Following envenomation with bungarotoxins, transmitter release is initially blocked (leading to a brief paralysis), followed by a period of massive overexcitation (cramps, tremors, spasms), which finally tails off to paralysis. These phases may not be seen in all parts of the body at the same time. Since kraits are nocturnal, encounters with humans are rare during daylight. Bites mainly occur during night. Bites are often initially painless, and thus may get unnoticed if the victim is sleeping. A bite from a krait is life-threatening, and should be regarded as a medical emergency.

Typically, victims start to complain of severe abdominal cramps accompanied by progressive muscular paralysis, frequently starting with ptosis. As no local symptoms are seen, a patient should be carefully observed for tell-tale signs of paralysis (e.g. the onset of bilateral ptosis, diplopia, and dysphagia), and treated urgently with antivenom. Frequently, little or no pain occurs at the site of a krait bite, which can provide false reassurance to the victim. The major medical difficulty of envenomated patients is the lack of medical resources (especially intubation supplies and mechanical ventilators in rural hospitals) and the ineffectiveness of the antivenom.

Once at a healthcare facility, support must be provided until the venom is metabolised and the victim can breathe unaided, especially if no species-specific antivenom is available. Given that the toxins alter acetylcholine transmission that causes the paralysis, some patients have been successfully treated with cholinesterase inhibitors, such as physostigmine or neostigmine, but success is variable and may be species-dependent, as well. If death occurs, it typically takes place about 6-12 hours after the krait bite, but can be significantly delayed. Cause of death is usually respiratory failure—suffocation by complete paralysis of the diaphragm. Even if patients make it to a hospital, subsequent permanent coma and even brain death from hypoxia may occur, given the potential for long transport times to get medical care.

Mortality rates caused by bites from the members of this genus vary by species; according to University of Adelaide Department of Toxicology, bites from the banded krait have a mortality rate of 1–10% in untreated humans, while that of the common krait is 70–80%. In common with those of all other venomous snakes, the death time and fatality rate resulting from bites of kraits depend on numerous factors, such as the venom yield and the health status of the victim.

Polyvalent elapid antivenom is effective in neutralizing of the venoms of B. candidus and B. flaviceps, and rather effective for  B. fasciatus, and the monovalent B. fasciatus antivenom is also moderately effective.

Species

*) Not including the nominate subspecies (typical form).
T) Type species

See also
 Locked-in syndrome

References

Further reading
Boulenger GA (1896). Catalogue of the Snakes in the British Museum (Natural History). Volume III., Containing the Colubridæ (Opisthoglyphæ and Proteroglyphæ) ... London: Trustees of the British Museum (Natural History). (Taylor and Francis, printers). xiv + 727 pp. + Plates I-XXV. (Genus Bungarus, pp. 365-366, Figure 26, three views of skull).
Daudin FM (1803). Histoire Naturelle, Génerale et Particulière des Reptiles; Ouvrage faisant suite aux Œuvres de Leclerc de Buffon, et partie de Cours complete d'Histoire naturelle rédigé par C.S. Sonnini, membre de plusieurs Sociétés savantes. Tome cinquième [Volume 5]. Paris: F. Dufart. 365 pp. (Bungarus, new genus, p. 263). (in French).

External links

Detailed account of Joe Slowinski's death via krait bite 

 
Reptiles of India
Reptiles of Pakistan
Reptiles of Sri Lanka
Taxa named by François Marie Daudin